Students for Justice in Palestine (SJP) is a pro-Palestinian college student activism organization in the United States, Canada and New Zealand. It has campaigned for boycott and divestment against corporations that deal with Israel and organized events about Israel's human rights violations.

As of 2019, SJP had over 200 chapters at American and Canadian universities. Some SJP chapters in the U.S. have adopted the name Palestine Solidarity Committee or Students for Palestinian Equal Rights. In Canada, some SJP chapters have adopted the name Students Against Israeli Apartheid (SAIA), or Solidarity for Palestinian Human Rights (SPHR).

Organization 
SJP has branches at the University of Auckland and Victoria University of Wellington.

History

Students for Justice in Palestine was first established at the University of California, Berkeley in 1993.

In 2001 the group organized the first Palestine Solidarity Movement (PSM) conference to coordinate corporate divestment from Israel efforts nationwide.

In March 2014 the Center for Student Involvement at Northeastern University suspended SJP from campus for a year after an incident that the Center called "intimidation" of fellow students. The university reached an agreement with SJP in April that lifted the suspension in exchange for a one-semester probation, during which SJP was allowed to operate as usual.

PSM served as a national umbrella organization for SJP and other groups until it dissolved in 2006. In October 2011, SJP held their first national conference at Columbia University, which was attended by 40 chapters.

The conference resolved on the organization's Points of Unity on October 16, 2011. The Points of Unity stated: "Students for Justice in Palestine is a student organization that works in solidarity with the Palestinian people and supports their right to self-determination. It is committed to ending Israel’s occupation and colonization of all Arab lands and dismantling the Separation Wall. It recognizes the fundamental rights of the Arab-Palestinian citizens of Israel to full equality. It calls for respecting, protecting and promoting the rights of Palestinian refugees to return to their homes and properties as stipulated in United Nations General Assembly Resolution 194."

SJP has used Facebook to do outreach, organize, and promote events on and off campus. Many chapters have hundreds of members and also use Twitter and other online social media networks for broader reach and visibility.

Protests

"Free Speech Fight" at UC Berkeley
In 2001, SJP's University of California, Berkeley chapter chose the memorial of the Deir Yassin massacre to occupy a campus building and disrupt a midterm exam in progress for over 600 students as part of a protest against the university's investments in Israel. Police broke up the occupation after warning the students of trespassing. Seventy-nine protesters were arrested for trespassing and resisting arrest. One protester was jailed on a charge of felony battery after he bit a police officer.

Following the arrests, SJP was banned from operating at UC Berkeley, prompting an SJP protest by 200 demonstrators a month later. University Chancellor Berdahl said, "It is important to understand that this is neither an issue of free speech, nor of the right to hold demonstrations on campus. The issue is the occupation of an academic building, interfering with the rights of other students to continue their education."

Wheeler Hall sit-in 
On April 9, 2002, SJP staged a sit-in Wheeler Hall, one of the University of California, Berkeley's largest classroom buildings. Police were called to the scene and the students ordered to leave or face arrest. 41 students did not leave and were arrested and charged with various violations of the university's Code of Student Conduct. The university also banned SJP from engaging in on-campus protests.

New Zealand
In 2006, Auckland University's SJP led demonstrations against the local weapons industry Rakon, a company that sells components to the U.S. military. On 28 September 2015, members of the Victoria University of Wellington's SJP branch picketed a talk by two visiting former Israeli soldiers that had been organized by the Australasian Union of Jewish Students.

Brandeis University
In April 2011, while speaking at Brandeis University, Avi Dichter, a member of the Knesset and of Israel's centrist and Kadima party, was interrupted by protesters from the university's SJP calling him a war criminal and accusing him of torture and crimes against humanity.

Vassar College

Every year the International Studies (IS) program at Vassar College has a course that sends students on a trip abroad. In 2013, it was decided that the trip would be to Israel and Palestine to study water issues for a course called The Jordan River Watershed. The trip drew the ire of SJP for, among other things, being coordinated with the Israeli research institute Arava Institute for Environmental Studies. On February 6, nine SJP members picketed an IS class and handed out leaflets criticizing Israel and Israeli appropriation of Palestinian water sources.

Loyola University Chicago 

On September 9, 2014, at Loyola University Chicago, students were manning a Hillel table promoting Birthright Israel, a program that pays for Jews to visit Israel. A group of Palestinian students affiliated with SJP lined up at the table and tried to register for trips to Israel. After conversations with the students manning the table, they were turned away because they were not Jews. The Palestinian students then lined up for a photo op some distance away with signs that read: "My family is from the ethnically cleansed village of [each place name] BUT I DO NOT HAVE THE RIGHT TO RETURN." According to members of SJP, the point of trying to register for Birthright Israel was to expose the program's racism.

The Hillel students complained and accused the Palestinian students of having harassed and verbally assaulted them "in an attempt to intimidate Jewish students." After two months of investigation, the university cleared SJP of those allegations, but found both Hillel and SJP responsible for having violated the University's Free Expression and Demonstration policy, Hillel for not having registered its table and SJP for not having registered its impromptu action, having learned about Hillel's tabling the night before.

As punishment, Hillel was required to attend an event on how to register events, while SJP was sanctioned with probation for the remainder of the school year, which prohibited it from requesting funds from the school for the duration. It was also required to attend "InterGroup Dialogue Training."

Campaigns

Bowdoin College
In May 2015, after a more than yearlong campaign, the SJP campaign at Bowdoin College to boycott Israel ended with 20% of students voting in favor, 21% abstaining and 59% voting against.

Hampshire College 

In February 2009, following a two-year campaign by SJP, signed by over 800 students, professors and alumni, Hampshire College in Massachusetts became the first U.S. college to divest from companies involved in the Israeli occupation of Palestine. The Board of Trustees decided to divest from Caterpillar, United Technologies, General Electric, ITT Corporation, Motorola and Terex.

Hampshire College President Ralph Hexter said the decision to divest from those companies was not aimed at Israel but related to socially responsible investing criteria, and criticized SJP for suggesting otherwise. SJP replied the college was shying away from the "political implications of its action".

DePaul University 

In November 2010, SJP at DePaul University began a campaign to have Sabra brand hummus removed from the university. The parent company of Sabra is the Strauss Group, an Israeli food company that supports two Israeli brigades, the Givati Brigade and the Golani Brigade. The university initially agreed, but reversed its stance a few days later by reinstating Sabra hummus in the dining halls. The university spokeswoman said, "in this instance the sale of Sabra hummus was temporarily suspended, by mistake, prior to review by the Fair Business Practices Committee. We have reinstated sales to correct that error by staff personnel."

In May 2011, the DePaul SJP presented a referendum to the Student Government on Sabra. The result was 1,127 in favor, 332 against and 8 extraneous write-ins. The number of votes were 32 short of the 1,500 needed for the referendum to be valid.

Stanford University 

Stanford's BDS (Boycott, Divestment and Sanctions) defeat was notably followed by two quick BDS victories at University of California, Riverside and University of California, San Diego. On March 8, 2013, substantial campaigning by SJP at University of California, Riverside (UCR) produced a victory when the Senate voted 11–5 to endorse BDS and divest from Caterpillar and Hewlett Packard. The vote in support of BDS at UCR was large enough to avoid a veto by the undergraduate student body president who opposed the resolution.

Criticism and controversies

Criticism from Zionist organizations 
Zionist organizations have charged that the SJP promotes antisemitism, and the Anti-Defamation League, a pro-Israel civil-rights law organization, maintains a page on SJP that lists episodes of what they call "Harassment of Student Groups" by its chapters and members.

AMCHA Initiative has published scholarship on the association between SJP groups, the BDS movement, and campus antisemitism, including a 2015 report that found that "the presence of an anti-Zionist student group such as Students for Justice in Palestine" is one of the two "best statistical predictors of overall antisemitic activity on a campus." A 2016 follow-up report found that antisemitism was "eight times more likely to occur on campuses with at least one active anti-Zionist student group such as SJP."

A 2016 report from researchers at the Steinhardt Social Research Institute confirmed the AMCHA Initiative's findings about the relationship between SJP groups and campus antisemitism.

BDS Forum at Brooklyn College 

On February 7, 2013, Brooklyn College's (BC) SJP chapter organized and held an open forum on the BDS movement and boycotts of Israel. The college's political science department co-sponsored the forum. The speakers were Judith Butler, an American philosopher who supports the BDS movement, and Omar Barghouti, a Palestinian who is one of its founders.

The forum attracted widespread media attention. Among its critics were the Anti-Defamation League, Alan Dershowitz, who called it an "anti-Israel hatefest", and New York politicians, who threatened to stop funding the college if the event was held. But the forum took place, with around 200 people in the audience and 150 anti-BDS protestors who had gathered outside.

During Butler's speech, four Jewish students of BC, Yvonne Juris, Melanie Goldberg, Ari Ziegler, and one unnamed student, were asked to leave. They had brought with them anti-BDS literature and flyers that they intended to hand out. According to Goldberg, the organizers of the event confronted them, demanded they hand over the papers, and asked a security guard to remove them from the event, which he did.

This caused controversy; the organizers were accused of antisemitism because the evicted students were Jewish and of stifling free speech. Four months later, the Zionist Organization of America (ZOA) filed a legal complaint against the college, alleging anti-Jewish discrimination. This caused BC to launch an investigation which resulted in a 40-page report two months later, while the students that organized the event sought legal help from the Center for Constitutional Rights. The report stated that the eviction was not discriminatory but based on a "political viewpoint". BC eventually settled with ZOA and President Karen Gould apologized for how the school had handled the event.

See also
 Antisemitism in the United States
 Antisemitism in the United States in the 21st century

Notes

Non-governmental organizations involved in the Israeli–Palestinian conflict
Student political organizations
Student political organizations in the United States
Palestinian solidarity movement